Sankt Ruprecht-Falkendorf is a small village of about 534 inhabitants in the District Murau, Styria in central Austria. It was created on 1 January 2005 by the fusion of Falkendorf and Sankt Ruprecht ob Murau. Since the 2015 Styria municipal structural reform, it is part of the municipality Sankt Georgen am Kreischberg.

References

External links 
 www.st-ruprecht-murau.steiermark.at - city website

Cities and towns in Murau District